The Hamburger Polo Club is a sports club in Hamburg, Germany, founded in 1898. The club participates in polo, field hockey, and tennis. The club's men's field hockey team is a member of Feldhockey Bundesliga, the top level professional men's field hockey league in Germany.

In their third season in the Bundesliga in 2021–22 the men's team reached the final of the championship for the first time. They lost the final 1–0 to Rot-Weiss Köln. The result also meant they qualified for the Euro Hockey League for the first time.

Current squads

Men's field hockey squad

References

External links
Official website

Field hockey clubs in Germany
Sport in Hamburg
Polo clubs
Sports clubs established in 1898
1898 establishments in Germany
Field hockey clubs established in 1898